Tancred is a Germanic given name, once common in the Middle Ages.

Tancred may also refer to:
 Tancred of Galilee, a leader of the First Crusade who became the first Prince of Galilee
 Tancred of Hauteville, a Norman lord who was the great-great grandfather of Tancred of Galilee
 Tancred (novel), a novel published in 1847 by Benjamin Disraeli, with a contemporary setting
 Tancred (play), a nineteenth-century play by John Augustus Stone, based on the crusader
 Tancred (Judges Guild), a 1980 role-playing game adventure
 Lawson-Tancred Baronets, title held by ancient Yorkshire family since 1662
 Tancred, California, in Yolo County, USA
 Tancred (band), the band project of Jess Abbott

See also
Tancrède (disambiguation), the French form
Tancredi (disambiguation), the Italian form
Tancredo (disambiguation), the Spanish and Portuguese form